"One More Try" is a 1995 song by American club music singer Kristine W, released as the second single from her debut album, Land of the Living (1996). It narrowly missed the Top 40 on the UK Singles Chart, peaking at number 41. In the US, it reached number-one on the Billboard Hot Dance Club Play chart, number 78 on the Billboard Hot 100 and number 64 on the Cash Box Top 100. In the Netherlands, "One More Try" peaked at number 16. Kristine W wrote the song after taking some friends to see her hometown and discovering her old junior high school had been condemned.

Critical reception
Larry Flick from Billboard wrote that the song, a long-anticipated follow-up to the massive "Feel What U Want" "is a true rarity in dance music. It makes a pensive and poignant lyrical point without clouding the track's overall potential to inspire active twitchin' and twirlin'. Producers Rollo and Rob D. have created a grand disco/house arrangement that allows Kristine to shine like the star she deserves to be." He also complimented the track as a "fun and blippy house anthem". In 1996, he described it as "heartwarming", adding, "Even a year after its first aborted shipment on EastWest, this track sounds as fresh and rhythmically relevant as ever." Daina Danin from Cash Box stated that "club fave Kristine W has a gorgeous, throaty voice and this lush, soulful dance track is already popular in New York City clubs through a Junior Vasquez remix, along with airplay on NY's WKTU and Philly's WIOQ." 

William Stevensen from Entertainment Weekly deemed it as an "infectious anthem". Daisy & Havoc from Music Weeks RM Dance Update rated it four out of five, adding, "Kristine W's new song is appealing in a subtle, miserable kind of way and it's made minimal and atmospheric by one Rollo & Sister Bliss mix and large and pounding by the other." Joey Bolsadura from Muzik called it "splendid". Ben Wener from Orange County Register declared it as "irresistible". 

Music video
A music video was produced to promote the single, directed by British director Lindy Heymann. She also directed the video for Kristine W's debut single, "Feel What You Want".

Track listing
 CD single, UK (1996)"One More Try" (Rollo And Sister Bliss Radio Edit) — 4:20
"One More Try" (Rollo And Sister Bliss Club Radio Edit) — 4:08
"One More Try" (Rollo And Sister Bliss Club Mix) — 6:57
"One More Try" (Def Club Mix) — 7:17
"One More Try" (Junior's Factory Mix) — 4:25
"One More Try" (Big Mix) — 4:10
"One More Try" (Monster Mix) — 4:16

 CD single, US (1996)'
"One More Try" (Original Version) — 4:20
"One More Try" (Rollo's Big Mix Edit) — 4:07
"One More Try" (Radio Edit) — 3:55

Charts

Weekly charts

Year-end charts

See also
List of number-one dance singles of 1996 (U.S.)

References

1996 singles
1996 songs
Champion Records singles
Kristine W songs
Music videos directed by Lindy Heymann
Songs written by Kristine W
Songs written by Rob Dougan
Songs written by Rollo Armstrong